Innathe Program is a 1991 Indian Malayalam film, directed by P. G. Vishwambharan and produced by Changanassery Basheer. The film stars Mukesh, Siddique, Radha (in her final Malayalam film to date), A. C. Zainuddin and Philomina in the lead roles. The film has musical score by Johnson.

Plot
Unnikrishan, Rajendran and Salim are friends and working in the same office. They live in a rented house. 
Indumathi joins their office as accountant. Unnikrishan and Indumathi falls in love an get married, without their family knowing. Unnikrishan is primarily afraid of his father and how they overcome the situation is the rest of the story.

Cast

Mukesh as Unnikrishnan Nair
Siddique as Rajendran
Radha as Indumathi
A. C. Zainuddin as Salim
Mammukoya as Moosa
Philomina as Bhargavikutty Amma
Baiju as Dasappan
Kalpana as Minikutty
Oduvil Unnikrishnan as Unni's Father
Thodupuzha Vasanthi as Unni's Mother
M. S. Thripunithura as Indu's Father
K.P.A.C. Lalitha as Bhageerathi
Thrissur Elsy as Manager
Rajan Mannarakkayam as Peon at Unni's office
Suvarna Mathew as Unni's neighbour

Soundtrack
The music was composed by Johnson and the lyrics were written by Bichu Thirumala.

References

External links
 

1991 films
1990s Malayalam-language films
Films directed by P. G. Viswambharan